Blind loach is a common name for several fishes and may refer to:

Eidinemacheilus smithi, native to Iran
Oreonectes anophthalmus, native to caves in China